The 12 September 2008 Dujail bombing occurred around 1800 local time (1500 UTC), on 12 September 2008 in Dujail, Salah ad Din Governorate, when a suicide bomber drove and detonated an explosive laden car into a police station killing 31 and injuring 60. A nearby medical clinic was also damaged. The attack occurred at around 6:20 pm local time. The attack was blamed on Al-Qaeda by US military, was the biggest attack in Iraq in months and came at a time when the violence had fallen to a 4-year low.

See also
List of terrorist incidents, 2008

References

2008 murders in Iraq
2008 bombing
Mass murder in 2008
Suicide car and truck bombings in Iraq
Terrorist incidents in Iraq in 2008
Violence against Shia Muslims in Iraq
September 2008 crimes
Attacks on police stations in the 2000s
Building bombings in Iraq